= Jacob Isaacs =

British literary scholar

Jacob Isaacs

Jacob Isaacs (6 December 1896 - 12 May 1973) was chair of English language and literature at Queen Mary College, University of London, from 1952 to 1964 and the author of more than thirty books and articles on the subject of English literature.

== Early life ==
Jacob Isaacs was born in London on 6 December 1896.

== Career ==
Isaacs was a lecturer at King's College London from 1928 to 1942. He then moved to Palestine, where he served as the first Montefiore Professor of English in the Hebrew University of Jerusalem from 1942 to 1945. Isaacs returned to England in 1945 and was Chair of English Language and Literature at Queen Mary College, University of London from 1952 to 1964. In 1953 he gave the British Academy's Shakespeare Lecture. He was the author of more than thirty books and articles on the subject of English literature.

== Death and legacy ==
Isaacs died in Lewisham Hospital on 12 May 1973. His papers are held at the Queen Mary Archives.

== Selected publications ==
- Production and Stage-Management at the Blackfriars Theatre. Shakespeare Association, 1935.
- Coleridge's Critical Terminology. English Association, 1936.
- The Background of Modern Poetry, delivered in the B.B.C., 3rd programme, by J. Isaacs. 1951.
- Shakespeare's Earliest Years in the Theatre: Annual Shakespeare Lecture of the British Academy. 1953.
